Georgia Spiropoulos (born in Greece, 1965) is a composer, who studied piano, harmony, counterpoint and fugue in Athens. At the same time, she studied jazz piano and worked as an instrumentalist and arranger of Hellenic traditional music of oral transmission for ten years.

Since 1996 she has lived in Paris and studied music composition, electro-acoustic and computer music with Philippe Leroux, form analysis with Michael Levinas, composition with Jacques Charpentier. She also worked with George Crumb and Günter Kahowez in France, Austria and Greece. She studied "Arts and Languages" at the School for Advanced Studies in the Social Sciences (EHESS).

Spiropoulos's works are published by Babelscores, Paris and by herself. Her music has been released by Eole Records, Subrosa, Collection QB, ArsPublica labels and Conservatoire de Paris - Cité de la Musique.

IRCAM
In the year 2000–01 she was one of the ten selected composers (among 400) to participate to the IRCAM's Composition and Musical Computing Annual Course and worked with Jonathan Harvey, Brian Ferneyhough, Tristan Murail, Marco Stroppa, Philippe Hurel and Ivan Fedele.
In 2008–10 she worked as composer-in-research with th project "Mask: Voice transformations and computer tools for live performance".

Commissions
She received commissions from the French Ministry of Culture, the Baden-Württemberg Ministry of Culture, Radio France, IRCAM-Centre Pompidou, “Marseille-Provence Cultural Capital of Europe 2013”, Sacem,  Onassis Foundation, Haus der Kulturen der Welt,  and numerous ensembles.

Performances
Her works are performed internationally at Centre Pompidou, Cité de la Musique, IRCAM, Louvre Auditorium (Paris), Symphony Space (New York), Yerba Buena Center for the Arts (San Francisco), Radial System V (Berlin), Gasteig München (Munich), ZKM (Karlsruhe), AOI Concert Hall (Shizuoka), Pollack Hall, Le Gesù, Le Vivier (Montreal), Felicja Blumenthal Music Center, Hateiva Hall (Tel Aviv), Concert Hall of the Academy of Music (Krakow), Onassis Stegi, French Institut, Goethe Institut (Athens). 
She participated at festivals such as Manifeste, Agora, Ars Musica, Tenso Days Berlin, Présences - Radio France, Athens & Epidaurus Festival, In Transit - International Festival of Performing Arts - Berlin, Seamus, Extension, Musiques Libres de Besançon, Gegenwelten Festival Neue Musik, Futura, WhyNote, Aujourd'hui Musiques, Musiques de Notre Temps, Hateiva, Sinkro, ICEM, ICMC, SMC, WFAE, WOCMAT, Electroacoustic Music Days of Greece, The Electronic Arts and Music Festival of Miami, Boston Cyberarts Festival.

Collaborations
She collaborates with many ensembles (Ensemble Intercontemporain, L’Itinéraire, Ensemble 2e2m, Sillages, Ars Nova, San Francisco Contemporary Music Players, McGill Contemporary Music Ensemble, Aventure, Nikel,  dissonArt, Bl!ndman, Sixtrum, Smashensemble, Curious Chamber Players, Pulsar Trio, Zafraan, Octopus), choirs (Accentus, Les Cris de Paris, Le Jeune Choeur de Paris, saxophone quartets (Prism, Habanera, Quasar), and soloists  (Claude Delangle, Médéric Collignon, Hélène Breschand, Alvise Sinivia, Shigeko Hata, Geraldine Keller, Theophilos Sotiriades, Vincent David, Valérie Joly) and conductors (Laurence Equilbey, David Milnes, Mark Foster, Pierre Roulier, Guillaume Bourgogne, Geoffroy Jourdain, Nicolas Krüger).

Pedagogy
 McGill University - Schulich School of Music. Distinguished Visiting Chair in Music Composition. Active Director of the Digital Composition Studio (DCS). 2017-18 
 ilSUONO 2019 International Contemporary Music Academy. Instructor, composer-in-residence. 2019
 Master classes and conferences : Columbia University (NYC), McGill University (Montreal), University of California Santa Barbara, University of Paris 7, University of Paris 8, University of Crete, IRCAM, ICMC and SMC International Conferences, Ars Musica Colloquium, Hochschule für Musik und Theater München, Paris Conservatory CRR, Tel Aviv Conservatory, Alte Schmiede-Vienna, French Institut of Athens.
 Jury member: IRCAM (Cursus, artistic research residences, Phd), ICMC and SMC International Conferences, ilSuono Summer Academy.

Awards
Civitella Ranieri Foundation Fellow 2020. Residency 2021.

Knight of the Order of Arts and Letters 2013. Made by France's Minister of Culture and Communication Aurélie Filippetti.

Royal Abbey of Fontevraud Fellowship 2017

Cité Internationale des Arts Fellowship 2009-2011

Villa Medicis Hors-les-Murs Award 2002 - AFAA & the French Ministry of Foreign Affairs; Composer-in-residence in the United States (NYC, Boston & Cambridge, 2003-2004).

Works
external link

Discography

 Phonotopia by Eole Records (booklet)
 Full discography

Bibliography
external link

References

External links
 Georgia Spiropoulos official site
 Babelscores Editions, Paris
 Centre de documentation de la musique contemporaine
 Georgia Spiropoulos @ Ircam 2019
 
 France Musique, Alla Breve, « Roll…n’Roll…n’Roll » de Georgia Spiropoulos
 Athens and Epidaurus Festival, Geografia Sonora
 Les 30 ans de l'Ensemble intercontemporain
 Georgia Spiropoulos "EROR (The Pianist)" (YouTube)
 Georgia Spiropoulos "The Bacchae" — "Les Bacchantes" (YouTube)

1965 births
Living people
21st-century French composers
French women composers
French music educators
21st-century French women musicians
Greek composers
Greek women composers
Greek women classical composers
Greek educators
Greek women musicians
20th-century women composers
21st-century women composers